Frederick Hurrell Holberton (28 October 1821 – 9 September 1907) was a member of the Queensland Legislative Council.

Holberton was born in Totnes, Devon, England in 1821 to William Holberton and his wife Elizabeth (née Harris) and was educated in Totnes.

He was appointed to the Queensland Legislative Council in July 1885, serving until his death in July 1907.

In 1869, Holberton married Sophie Hope Best and there are no records of them having had children. He died in 1907 and was buried in Drayton and Toowoomba Cemetery.

References

Members of the Queensland Legislative Council
1821 births
1907 deaths
People from Totnes
English emigrants to Australia
19th-century Australian politicians